Jawahar (Jay) Kalra MD, PhD, FRCPC, FCAHS, CCPE is a Canadian physician, clinical researcher and educator. Kalra is a professor at the Department of Pathology and Laboratory Medicine at the University of Saskatchewan, a Fellow of the Royal College of Physicians and Surgeons of Canada, the Canadian Academy of Clinical Biochemistry, the Canadian Academy of Health Sciences, an Elected Fellow of the Royal Society of Medicine, UK and a Canadian Certified Physician Executive Leader (CCPE). Kalra also serves as a member, Board of Governors University of Saskatchewan and Board of Directors, Council of Canadian Academies (CCA).

Biography 
Born in Aligarh, India, he began his post-secondary studies at the Aligarh Muslim University earning a BSc in Chemistry and Biology in 1967 followed by his MSc in biochemistry in 1969. He joined All India Institute of Medical Sciences as a junior research fellow in Biochemistry in 1969. He continued his studies at Memorial University in Newfoundland earning a MSc degree in 1972, a PhD in 1976, and his MD in 1981. He did residency training at the University of Ottawa and was the senior resident in the Departments of Medicine and Laboratory Medicine at Ottawa Civic and Ottawa General Hospitals. He is a Fellow of the Royal College of Physicians and Surgeons of Canada, the Canadian Academy of Clinical Biochemistry, the Canadian Academy of Health Sciences, an Elected Fellow of the Royal Society of Medicine, UK,  and a Canadian Certified Physician Executive (CCPE).

In 1985 he accepted a position with the Department of Pathology at the University of Saskatchewan and Royal University Hospital.

Kalra served as the Head of the Department of Pathology in the College of Medicine (1991-2000) and Head of the Department of Laboratory Medicine for the Saskatoon Health Region (1994-2000). Kalra has served as national president of numerous medical associations and scientific societies including the Canadian Association of Medical Biochemists (1993–95), Intersociety Council of Laboratory Medicine (1994–96), Canadian Chairs of Pathology and Laboratory Medicine (1995-2000), Canadian Association of Pathologists (1999-2000), and of the American College of Angiology (2004). He was a founding member (1991) and Director (1998-2000) of the Saskatchewan Stroke Research Centre. He has served on various committees of the College of Medicine and the University of Saskatchewan including Chair of University Planning and Priority Committee (2008–10) and the Chair of the University of Saskatchewan Representative Council (2011–16). He has also served on the board of directors of the Canadian Academy of Health Sciences (CAHS), as a member of the Council on Health Policy and Economics, Canadian Medical Association (CMA), the Legislative Committee, Saskatchewan Medical Association (SMA) and as a council member of the Canadian Society for Clinical Investigation (CSCI).

Kalra has also been actively involved as a physician leader in healthcare reform and administrative work. He has served as Clinical Chief (Head), Department of Lab Medicine Saskatoon District Health (1994-2000), member of the executive medical advisory committee (1994–96), founding chair of the Saskatoon District Health Infection Control Committee (1996–97), and member of the clinical review panel (1992–94) to design the distribution of clinical services at various hospitals in the Saskatoon Health Region.

Kalra's research focuses on establishing the best practices and guidelines for quality care and patient safety, medical error  and disclosure policy, total quality management programs, artificial intelligence, and laboratory utilization in health care. Kalra is author of a book entitled “Medical Errors and Patient Safety – Strategies to Reduce and Disclose Medical Errors and Improve Patient Safety.” He has been a champion in establishing a non-punitive “no-fault model” to address clinical/medical errors, and in developing educational programs and clinical guidelines reflecting evidence-based medicine. Kalra has received several research grants and has published more than 100 peer reviewed articles and 250 research abstracts.

Kalra is a leader and community builder in several altruistic organizations including Saskatoon Folkfest, Multicultural Council of Saskatchewan, Hindu Society (Hindu Temple) of Saskatchewan, Saskatchewan Intercultural Association (SIA), Rotary Clubs in Saskatoon, Heart and Stroke Foundation of Saskatchewan, Literacy Foundation and the Canadian National Institute for the Blind (CNIB). Kalra has worked in building the social, cultural, intercultural understanding and strengthening the fabric of multiculturalism in Saskatoon, Saskatchewan and beyond. He has been called a “Cultural and Diversity Ambassador”.

Honours
 RBC – Top 25 Canadian Immigrant Awards, 2013 Winner
 Queen Elizabeth II Diamond Jubilee Medal, 2012
 Canadian Association for Medical Education (CAME/ACEM) Certificate of Merit Award for Outstanding Contributions to Medical Education, 2012
 Saskatchewan Health Research Foundation Achievement Award in Clinical Research, 2005
 Queen Elizabeth II Golden Jubilee Medal, 2002
 Kalra was named Citizen of the Year for 2015 by CTV News Saskatoon.
Grasswood Canada 150 Award Recipient
Recipient of Canada's Paul Yuzyk Award for Multiculturalism-Lifetime Achievement in 2015
One of 60 Influential Canadians over 60 recognized in a Senior Living blog, A Place for Mom chose 60 extraordinary Canadians over 60 who are esteemed for their contributions to society
“Saskatchewan Centennial Leadership Award” for outstanding contribution to province
"Golden Wheel Award for Excellence in Science and Technology 1994", Rotary Clubs of Saskatoon
"Excellence of Research Award 1994", Canadian Society of Clinical Chemists
Recipient, 10 University of Saskatchewan (U of S) Canada 150 Citizen, University of Saskatchewan, 2017

References

Indian pathologists
Canadian pathologists
People from Aligarh
1949 births
Living people
Canadian healthcare managers
Fellows of the Royal College of Physicians and Surgeons of Canada
Indian emigrants to Canada
Memorial University of Newfoundland alumni